Annen is a German surname. Notable people with the surname include:

 Blake Annen (born 1991), American football player
 Martin Annen (born 1974), Swiss bobsledder
 Niels Annen (born 1973), German politician
 Roland Annen (1916–2005), Swiss field hockey player

German-language surnames